Michael Deek (born June 21, 1970) is an American professional wrestler, currently wrestling on the independent circuit under the ring name Anthony Michaels. He is best known for his appearances with Extreme Championship Wrestling as a member of The Dudley Brothers under the ring name Snot Dudley in summer 1995. He is also known for his appearances with Smoky Mountain Wrestling in Tennessee and on the independent circuit in Florida and the northeastern United States.

Professional wrestling career

Smoky Mountain Wrestling (1993-1995)
Deek relocated from New York City to Morristown, Tennessee to train as a professional wrestler under Tim Horner at the Smoky Mountain Wrestling training camp. He made his debut with Smoky Mountain Wrestling on August 21, 1993 as "Anthony Michaels", losing to Joe Cazana.

In March 1994, Deek was repackaged as the masked "Fire" and placed in a tag team with Brimstone called "The Infernos". The Infernos went on to compete in the SMW tag team division, competing against teams such as The Thrillseekers (Chris Jericho and Lance Storm) and The Rock 'n' Roll Express. Deek alternated between the two ring names until leaving SMW in February 1995.

Extreme Championship Wrestling (1995)

Deek debuted in the Philadelphia, Pennsylvania-based promotion Extreme Championship Wrestling on July 1, 1995 at Hardcore Heaven. Wearing overalls, a tie-dyed shirt, high-tops and glasses, Deek was given the gimmick of "Lil' Snot Dudley", one of the three original members of The Dudley Brothers along with Dudley Dudley and Big Dick Dudley. In their debut match, Snot Dudley and Dudley Dudley scored an upset victory over The Pitbulls.

Shortly after their debut, the Dudley family aligned themselves with Raven, joining Raven's Nest and feuding with The Pitbulls. At Heat Wave on July 15, 1995, Dudley Dudley and Snot Dudley teamed with Raven in a loss to Tommy Dreamer and The Pitbulls. Shortly thereafter, Deek was injured in a jet ski accident and left ECW, with his departure attributed to a  broken pelvis resulting from a superbomb delivered by The Pitbulls at Heat Wave.

Independent circuit (1995-present)

After recovering from his injury, Deek returned to wrestling on the independent circuit in Florida. In 1998, Deek formed a tag team with Jeff Roth, who adopted the ring name "Schmuck Dudley". The duo wrestled for the Florida-based Future of Wrestling promotion as "The Dudleys". In 1999, Deek reverted to the ring name Anthony Michaels and Schmuck to Jeff Roth, changing the name of their tag team to "Wildside", then to "Animal House". The duo won the FOW Tag Team Championship on three occasions between 1998 and 2002. Deek remained with FOW until the promotion folded in 2003. Deek also wrestled for other independent promotions in Florida such as Florida Championship Wrestling and Coastal Championship Wrestling.

In 2003, Deek joined the Pennsylvania-based promotion World Xtreme Wrestling, where he formed a tag team with Mark Gore called "The Untouchables". The duo won the WXW Tag Team Championship in May 2004, holding the titles until August of that year. The Untouchables continued to wrestled intermittently for WXW over the following eight years. The duo also performed for other independent promotions in the northeastern United States such as the Connecticut-based Defiant Pro Wrestling and the Massachusetts-based Powerhouse Wrestling.

Deek made a one-off appearance with World Wrestling Entertainment on the March 13, 2007 episode of ECW on Sci Fi as "Mikey Deek". Deek and Danny Jacks lost to Snitsky in a handicap match.

In 2010, Deek returned to the Future of Wrestling promotion after it was resurrected, repeatedly challenging for the FOW Heavyweight Championship and the FOW International Heavyweight Championship. In December 2012, Deek and The Beast won the FOW Tag Team Championship, marking Deek's fourth reign with the championship.

On November 9, 2013, Deek and several other ECW alumni took part in a 22 wrestler "hardcore rumble" for Tommy Dreamer's House of Hardcore promotion in Poughkeepsie, New York.

In 2013, Deek opened a professional wrestling-themed store, Wrestling Paradise, in Wallingford, Connecticut.

Personal life
Deek is an avid guitar player. While wrestling for Smoky Mountain Wrestling in Tennessee in the early 1990s, he formed a two-piece glam rock band called "Slippery Nipple" with his roommate and fellow wrestler Chris Jericho as bassist.

Championships and accomplishments
Coastal Championship Wrestling
CCW Tag Team Championship (2 times) – with Jeff Roth
Defiant Pro Wrestling
DPW Tag Team Championship (2 times) - with Mark Gore
Florida Championship Wrestling
FCW Caribbean Islands Championship (1 time)
FCW Heavyweight Championship (1 time)
FCW Tag Team Championship (3 times) – with Schmuck Dudley / Jeff Roth
Future of Wrestling
FOW Tag Team Championship (4 times) – with Schmuck Dudley / Jeff Roth (3 times) and The Beast (1 time)
World Xtreme Wrestling
WXW Tag Team Championship (1 time) – with Mark Gore

References

External links
 
 

1970 births
American male professional wrestlers
American rock guitarists
American male guitarists
Living people
Masked wrestlers
People from Copiague, New York
Professional wrestlers from New York (state)
The Dudley Brothers members
21st-century American guitarists
21st-century American male musicians